Xuzhou University of Technology, formerly Xuzhou Institute of Technology, is a comprehensive university located in Xuzhou, Jiangsu province of China and is one of the provincial universities administered by Chinese Ministry of Education.

Main Campuses
The campus south of the city (main campus): 3rd Ring Road, Quanshan District
Central campus (new campus): Xincheng District
Other campuses: Feihong Campus, Xiyuan Campus, Yongan Campus, Hubin Campus

History
Having got the permission from Ministry of Education and the Jiangsu Provincial Government, Pengcheng Vocational University was merged with Xuzhou Economic Management Cadre College and then became Xuzhou University of Technology in March 2005. In June 2007, Xuzhou Normal Academy founded in 1959 was merged into it. The Chinese ministry of Education granted permission for the school to become a  Full-time undergraduate college. This allowed the university to become a comprehensive university with specializations in engineering and sciences. This university was awarded as Garden-like School Advanced Collective award and some other prizes by the local government. The development of the Center campus was another very important milestone. Now it has several campuses which cover about 2035 acres with fixed assets worth 0.8 billion yuan and teaching equipment worth 120 million yuan.

Today
As a college established by both the province and the municipality, Xuzhou University of Technology has more space to make a further development and has established a strong relationship with Xuzhou Normal University, Xuzhou Medical College, China University of Mining and Technology, and Xuzhou Corps Command College. This university is aimed to cultivate talents who develop in an all-around way. Making constant efforts to improve the teaching quality and comprehensive strength makes it continue to rise in college rankings. Besides, the discipline structure is more rational, dominant disciplines are more obvious, and it has been trying its best to achieve a higher task.

The Library
The library in Xuzhou University of Technology consists of the main library and the branch libraries of Center campus, occupying an area of 25,208 square metres equipped with more than 2000 seats.
The main library located in the south of Xuzhou is designed by a famous architect-Qi Kang, an academician of the Chinese Academy of Engineering. Its architectural style is with a solemn atmosphere. In the library, all things are laid out rationally and suitably with recreational Facilities. All the documents are arranged according to the settings of subjects, adopting a service pattern of borrowing and reading integration, thus improving the work and service efficiency of the library, which reflects the concept of people first. 
At present, the library has about 800,000 books, and has been an integrated library system including books, magazines, newspaper, video products, computer files and so on. The first floor hall is equipped with corridors for professors, building an atmosphere of showing respect to teachers and attaching great importance to education.

Teaching staff
The college now has 1095 full-time teachers, including 69 professors, 330 associate professors, 408 masters and 157 doctors. Among them, three are external academicians, one is a judge of the State science and technology prizes, and three are awarded second grade professors. Five experts receive the Government Allowance.
Now, the school has established 32 labs, 10 research institutes, 1 training center for engineering education, 3 Professional practice bases and more than 180 practice bases outside school. The teaching team of construction budget is provincial excellent teaching team. Besides,  the experimental center for Food and Biological engineering, the experimental center for Electrical and Electronic Engineering, and the experimental center for physics are construction points for provincial teaching demonstration centres.

Schools and Departments
Schools of Economics
Economics; International Trade and commerce; Electronic Commerce; Finance and Revenue; Economic Law;  Investment and Financing
Education Science and Technology Institute
Elementary School Education; Chinese Education; Educational Technology; Education; Psychology; Modern Educational Technology
Physical Culture Institute
College of Humanities
Chinese Language and Literature; Advertising
Foreign Language Department
School of Arts
Artistic Design; Clothing Design and Engineering; Animated drawing [cartoon]; Musicology
Mathematics and Physicals Science Technology
 Information and Computing Science;Applied Physics; Electronic Science and Technology
School of Chemistry and Chemical Engineering
Applied chemistry; Chemical Engineering and Technology
Department of Information and Electrical Engineering
Electrical Engineering and the Automatization Specialty; Computer Science and Technology; Electronic Information Science and Technology;
Mechanical and Electrical Engineering Institute
 Mechanical Design and Manufacturing Automation; Industrial Design Education; Material Forming and Control Engineering; Numerical Control Technique; Polymer Materials Science and Engineering
Civil Engineering Department
Civil Engineering; Professional Engineering Management; Construction Management; Construction Engineering Technology
School of Environment Engineering
Landscape Architecture; Water Supply and Sewerage Work
College of Food Science and Biotechnology
Biological Engineering; Food Science and Engineering
School of Management
Marketing Management; Accounting; Financial Management; Tourism Management; Logisticis Engineering; Information Management and Information System; Engineering Management

Academic Journals

Natural Science Edition

Social Science Edition

External links
Xuzhou University of Technology(Chinese)

References

Universities and colleges in Jiangsu